Eagle claw may refer to:

The claw of an eagle
Eagle Claw, a style of Chinese martial arts
Operation Eagle Claw, a 1980 U.S. military rescue operation during the Iran hostage crisis
 A service, dubbed “Eagle Claw”, run by Nigeria’s Economic and Financial Crimes Commission and using smart technology developed by Microsoft to track down fraudulent emails, and capable of warning a quarter of a million potential victims of Nigerian scams.
Operation Eagle Claw XI, a 2007 military operation in the Iraq War
Aetonyx, a Jurassic dinosaur whose name derives from the Greek word for “eagle claw”

See also
Bird's foot (disambiguation)
Chicken claw (disambiguation)
Claw (disambiguation)
Eagle (disambiguation)
Eagles Claw (disambiguation)